A coin of account is a unit of money that does not exist as an actual coin (that is, a metal disk) but is used in figuring prices or other amounts of money.

Examples

Mill
The mill (or sometimes, mil) is a coin of account in the United States.  It is equal to one-tenth of a penny, and so to one-thousandth of a dollar (= $0.001), whence the name, which means "thousandth." There was never such a coin minted by the U.S. Federal government, though some states minted these coins well into the mid-1900s. Coins of account are used in accounting and for figuring taxes, usually either property taxes or sales taxes.

Guinea
From 1816 to the 1980s the British Guinea was no longer used a coin but prices for luxury items and professional services were often quoted in guineas, on the understanding that a guinea was equal to 21 shillings.

See also
 Unit of account
 Money
 Digital currency

Money